Christian Borgatello (born February 10, 1982) is an Italian professional ice hockey defenceman who participated at the 2010 IIHF World Championship as a member of the Italy men's national ice hockey team.

Borgatello was born in Merano, Italy.

References

External links

1982 births
Living people
Bolzano HC players
Ice hockey players at the 2006 Winter Olympics
Italian ice hockey defencemen
Olympic ice hockey players of Italy
Sportspeople from Merano